Visviri is a Chilean hamlet at the northern end of the country and the capital of the General Lagos commune in Parinacota Province, Arica and Parinacota Region. It is notable for being Chile's northernmost populated area. Pop. 265 (2002), and for being near border of three countries of Bolivia, Peru and Chile. The Bolivian settlement of Charaña is located to the east and Tripartito, Peru lies to the north.

Bolivia–Chile border crossings
Populated places in Parinacota Province
Hamlets in Chile